Últimos días de la víctima may refer to:

 Últimos días de la víctima (novel), a 1979 Argentine novel
 Últimos días de la víctima (film), a 1982 film adaptation of the novel